Cremocarpon is a genus of flowering plants in the family Rubiaceae. The genus is found on the Comoros and Madagascar.

Species 
 Cremocarpon bernieri Bremek. - northern Madagascar
 Cremocarpon boivinianum Baill. - Mayotte
 Cremocarpon fissicorne Bremek. - western Madagascar
 Cremocarpon floribundum Bremek. - southeastern Madagascar
 Cremocarpon lantzii Bremek. - eastern and southeastern Madagascar
 Cremocarpon pulchristipulum Bremek. - central and north-central Madagascar
 Cremocarpon sessilifolium Bremek. - northern Madagascar
 Cremocarpon tenuifolium Bremek. - northern Madagascar
 Cremocarpon trichanthum (Baker) Bremek. - central Madagascar

References

External links 
 Cremocarpon in the World Checklist of Rubiaceae

Rubiaceae genera
Psychotrieae